Delano Burgzorg (born 7 November 1998) is a Dutch professional footballer who plays on loan as a forward for French club USL Dunkerque.

Club career
On 31 January 2020, Burgzorg was loaned to Heracles Almelo with an option to buy.

On 29 January 2022, Burgzorg joined Mainz 05 on loan. On 17 May 2022, Mainz exercised their option to make the transfer permanent and Burgzorg signed a three-year contract with the club.

Personal life
Born in the Netherlands, Burgzorg is of Surinamese descent.

Career statistics

References

External links
 Profile at the 1. FSV Mainz 05 website 

Living people
1998 births
Dutch footballers
Dutch sportspeople of Surinamese descent
Association football forwards
Eredivisie players
Eerste Divisie players
Derde Divisie players
Serie B players
Bundesliga players
De Graafschap players
Spezia Calcio players
Heracles Almelo players
1. FSV Mainz 05 players
Footballers from Amsterdam
Dutch expatriate footballers
Dutch expatriate sportspeople in Italy
Expatriate footballers in Italy
Dutch expatriate sportspeople in Germany
Expatriate footballers in Germany